Caimi is a family name of Italian origin. It may refer to:

 Antonio Caimi, Italian painter
 Giuseppe Caimi, Italian soldier and football player
 Lamberto Caimi, Italian cinematographer
 Dorival Caymmi (whose great-grandfather was Enrico Balbino Caimi), Brazilian singer-songwriter

Surnames of Italian origin